13 Seconds to Love is the third album by Filipino rock band, Kjwan.  It was first launched on digital format on 6 February 2009 at A. Venue Mall (Makati), preloaded on Nokia 5800 XpressMusic cellphones. Although the album was released around 21 July 2009 through MCA Music Philippines, it was only until exactly a month later that the CD was officially launched at Saguijo (Makati).

Album information
A Malaysian DJ/producer once told Kjwan that he can tell whether a song will be a hit within the first thirteen seconds. It stuck with the band and brought this along with their song writing with love as the common theme.

Kjwan focused mainly on the album's songwriting and put flashy guitar solos, drum fills, and complicated odd-time bits on the backseat resulting to a different sound from the band's two previous albums. 13 Seconds to Love also marks Jorel's break with the band to pursue his studies at Berklee College of Music.

Track listing

Personnel
Marc Abaya – vocals / guitar
Kelley Mangahas – bass
Boogie Romero – guitar / vocals 
Jorel Corpus – guitar / percussion
J-Hoon Balbuena – drum / vocals

Credits
"13 Seconds to Love", "What About Us", "Pause", "Meron Ba", "Lifeline", "Sunny Weather", "Dance on the Floor", and "One Life" was recorded at Kerplunk! Studios by Pat Jalbuena
"Complicated", "Drowning", and "Nasilayan" was recorded at Circus Studios by Niño Avenido.
Additional Production by Niño Avenido
Mixed and Mastered in Kerplunk! Studios by Pat Jalbuena
Keys in "Pause" by Dan Gil and Inky De Dios
Keys in "Dance on the Floor" by Inky De Dios
Sax and Flute on "Dance on the Floor" by Alvin Cornista
String Arrangement on "Meron Ba" by Rico Ledesma
Shaker on "Sunny Weather" by Luis Rodriguez
Additional Vocals on "13 Seconds to Love" by the Kjwan Kids
Cover artwork by Rom Villaseran
Technical layout by Kelvin Uy
Band photo by Jose Quintas-Primero

Reference 

2009 albums
Kjwan albums
Universal Music Group albums